Brush Hollow Reservoir is located in Brush Hollow State Wildlife Area, northwest of Penrose, Colorado, in Fremont County.

References

Reservoirs in Colorado
Bodies of water of Fremont County, Colorado